Zabrus incrassatus is a species of beetle in the family Carabidae.

Description
The head is large. Elitrae are elongated, with light longitudinal striae. Body color is bright black.

Distribution
This species is present in Albania, Belgium, Bulgaria, Croatia, Greece, Macedonia, former Yugoslavia and in the Near East.

References

External links
Trechinae

Zabrus
Beetles described in 1814